Events from the year 1979 in Scotland.

Incumbents 

 Secretary of State for Scotland and Keeper of the Great Seal – Bruce Millan until 4 May; then George Younger

Law officers 
 Lord Advocate – Ronald King Murray; then Lord Mackay of Clashfern
 Solicitor General for Scotland – Lord McCluskey; then Nicholas Fairbairn

Judiciary 
 Lord President of the Court of Session and Lord Justice General – Lord Emslie
 Lord Justice Clerk – Lord Wheatley
 Chairman of the Scottish Land Court – Lord Elliott

Events 
 1 March – Scottish devolution referendum: Scotland votes by a majority of 77,437 for a Scottish Assembly, which is not implemented at this time due to a condition that at least 40% of the electorate must support the proposal.
 17 March – Penmanshiel Tunnel collapses during reconstruction, killing two workers. A replacement tunnel opens to rail traffic on 20 August.
 12 April – Cromarty Bridge opens.
 16 April – Paisley Gilmour Street rail accident: Seven killed in a head-on collision.
 4 May – UK general election: The Labour Party wins the majority of seats in Scotland but the Conservatives win by a 43-seat majority across the UK as a whole, with Margaret Thatcher becoming the first female Prime Minister. George Younger is appointed Secretary of State for Scotland, an office he will hold until January 1986.
 7 June – the first election is held for the European Parliament, with the Conservatives winning five, Labour winning two and the Scottish National Party winning one of the 8 seats available in Scotland.
 12 June – the Tayberry is patented.
 8 September – Wolverhampton Wanderers F.C. set a new UK transfer record by paying just under £1,500,000 for Glasgow-born Aston Villa and Scotland striker Andy Gray.
 Property on Raasay is sold to the Highlands and Islands Development Board.

Births 
 23 January – Dawn O'Porter, née Porter, television presenter and novelist
 2 February – David Paisley, actor
 15 February
Scott Severin, footballer
Gordon Shedden, racing driver
 22 February – Claire Johnston, lawn bowler
 20 April – Gregor Tait, swimmer
 21 April – James McAvoy, actor
 11 May – Tim Baillie, slalom canoer
 15 May – James Mackenzie, actor and television presenter
 9 June – Fraser Watts, cricketer
 20 June – Julie Fowlis, folk singer
 31 August – Simon Neil, singer-songwriter

Deaths 
 24 February – Sir James Hutchison, 1st Baronet, shipbuilder, army officer and politician (born 1893)
 16 September – Marion Cameron Gray, mathematician (born 1902)
 27 September – Jimmy McCulloch, musician (born 1953)

The arts
Alternative rock trio Cocteau Twins is formed in Grangemouth.
National Youth Orchestra of Scotland is formed.
Pier Arts Centre established in Stromness to display the collection of modern British art donated by Margaret Gardiner.

See also 
 1979 in Northern Ireland

References 

 
Scotland
Years of the 20th century in Scotland
1970s in Scotland